Granular synthesis is a sound synthesis method that operates on the microsound time scale.

It is based on the same principle as sampling. However, the samples are split into small pieces of around 1 to 100 ms in duration. These small pieces are called grains. Multiple grains may be layered on top of each other, and may play at different speeds, phases, volume, and frequency, among other parameters.

At low speeds of playback, the result is a kind of soundscape, often described as a cloud, that is manipulatable in a manner unlike that for natural sound sampling or other synthesis techniques. At high speeds, the result is heard as a note or notes of a novel timbre. By varying the waveform, envelope, duration, spatial position, and density of the grains, many different sounds can be produced.

Both have been used for musical purposes: as sound effects, raw material for further processing by other synthesis or digital signal processing effects, or as complete musical works in their own right. Conventional effects that can be achieved include amplitude modulation and time stretching. More experimentally, stereo or multichannel scattering, random reordering, disintegration and morphing are possible.

History 

Greek composer Iannis Xenakis is known as the inventor of the granular synthesis technique.

Curtis Roads was the first to implement granular synthesis on a computer in 1974. 

Twelve years later, in 1986 the Canadian composer Barry Truax implemented real-time versions of this synthesis technique. "Granular synthesis was implemented in different ways by Truax."

Microsound  

This includes all sounds on the time scale shorter than musical notes, the sound object time scale, and longer than the sample time scale.  Specifically, this is shorter than one tenth of a second and longer than 10 milliseconds, which includes part of the audio frequency range (20Hz to 20kHz) as well as part of the infrasonic frequency range (below 20Hz, rhythm).

These sounds include transient audio phenomena and are known in acoustics and signal processing by various names including sound particles, quantum acoustics, sonal atom, grain, glisson, grainlet, trainlet, microarc, wavelet, chirplet, fof, time-frequency atom, pulsar, impulse, toneburst, tone pip, acoustic pixel, and others. In the frequency domain they may be named kernel, logon, and frame, among others.

Physicist Dennis Gabor was an important pioneer in microsound. Micromontage is musical montage with microsound.

Microtime is the level of "sonic" or aural "syntax" or the "time-varying distribution of...spectral energy".

Related software 
 Csound – comprehensive music software including granular synthesis (overview of granular synthesis opcodes)
 Max/MSP – graphical authoring software for real-time audio and video
 Pure Data (Pd) – graphical programming language for real-time audio and video
 SuperCollider – programming language for real time audio synthesis
 ChucK - strongly-timed computer music programming language

Related hardware 

 Mutable Instruments Clouds – a digital, open source eurorack synthesizer module which has four factory set modes, the first and default being a granular processor
 Make Noise Morphagene – a eurorack synthesizer moduler built around microsound, or granular synthesis, in addition to Musique Concrète-inspired sound on sound audio manipulation

See also 
 Digital signal processing
 Micromontage audio montage on the time scale of microsounds
 Texture synthesis, analogous process for images

References

Bibliography

Articles 
 "Granular Synthesis" by Eric Kuehnl
 "The development of GiST, a Granular. Synthesis Toolkit Based on an Extension of the FOF Generator" by Gerhard Eckel and Manuel Rocha Iturbide
 Searching for a global synthesis technique through a quantum conception of sound by Manuel Rocha Iturbide
 Further articles on Granular Synthesis
 Bencina, R. (2006) "Implementing Real-Time Granular Synthesis", in Greenbaum & Barzel (eds.), Audio Anecdotes III, A.K. Peters, Natick. online pdf

Books

Discography
Curtis Roads (2004). CD with Microsounds. MIT Press. . Contains excerpts of nscor and Field (1981). .
nscor (1980), 
Iannis Xenakis.

External links 
 Granular Synthesis Resource Web Site

Sound synthesis types